Vincent Valdez (born 1977) is an American artist born in San Antonio, Texas, who focuses on painting, drawing, and printmaking. His artwork often emphasizes themes of social justice, memory, and ignored or under-examined historical narratives. Valdez completed his B.F.A. at the Rhode Island School of Design in 2000. He lives and works in Houston, Texas, and is represented by the David Shelton Gallery (Houston) and Matthew Brown Gallery (Los Angeles). Valdez's work has been exhibited at Museum of Fine Arts, Houston, Ford Foundation, Los Angeles County Museum of Art, National Portrait Gallery (United States), Blanton Museum of Art, Parsons School of Design, and the Fundacion Osde Buenos Aires.

Early life and education

Early years 
Valdez was born in the South Side of San Antonio, Texas, in 1977. Valdez's interests in art emerged at an early age. At age nine, he took up mural painting under the mentorship of Alex Rubio, another young San Antonio artist. Under Rubio's direction, Valdez worked on a series of murals; the first was located at the former site of the Esperanza Peace and Justice Center in San Antonio. Later, Rubio and Valdez worked side-by-side to complete murals under the auspices of the Community Cultural Arts program.

Education 
After graduating from Burbank High School, Valdez enrolled in art school in Florida, but shortly thereafter transferred to the Rhode Island School of Design (RISD) on a full scholarship. He completed his B.F.A. there in 2000. He had his first solo exhibition at the Guadalupe Cultural Arts Center's Theater Gallery in San Antonio in his last year at RISD. His senior project at RISD culminated in his iconic piece Kill the Pachuco Bastard! 2000). The painting depicts the 1943 Zoot Suit riots and was acquired by entertainer and arts collector and advocate Cheech Marin. The piece was exhibited as part of Cheech's Chicano Visions: American Painters on the Verge, which traveled to numerous venues including San Antonio Museum of Art, the National Hispanic Cultural Center in Albuquerque, the Indiana State Museum, Museum of Contemporary Art, La Jolla, and the De Young Museum in San Francisco.

Career

Residencies and awards
Valdez held residencies at Skowhegan School of Painting and Sculpture (2005), The Vermont Studio Center (2011), the Blue Star Contemporary Berlin Residency/Kunstlerhaus Bethanien (2014), and The Joan Mitchell Foundation Artist in Residency (2018). He is a 2015 recipient of The Joan Mitchell Foundation Grant for Painters and Sculptors. In 2015, he earned The Texas Commission on the Arts State Artist Award. Artadia named Valdez and his collaborator Adriana Corral as the 2019 Houston Award Winners. Valdez was a 2020 Studio Fellow at NXTHVN, an organization in New Haven, CT founded by Titus Kaphar, Jason Price, and Jonathan Brand, NXTHVN fellowships are designed to foster "intergenerational mentorship, cross-sector collaboration, and local engagement [to] accelerate the careers of the next generation and foster retention of professional art talent." During his fellowship, Valdez exhibited his work in the group show NXTHVN: Un/Common Proximity at James Cohan Gallery in New York, NY with Allana Clarke, Alisa Sikelianos-Carter, Daniel T. Gaitor-Lomack, Jeffrey Meris, Esteban Ramón Pérez, and Ilana Savdie. Un/Common Proximity was curated by 2020-2021 NXTHVN Curatorial Fellow, Claire Kim.

In 2022, Valdez was a finalist and one of seven prizewinners for the Sixth Triennial Outwin Boochever Portrait Competition; he received one of four commendations.  He was a 2022 recipient of the Mellon Foundation's Latinx Artist Fellowship.

Exhibitions 
Valdez has shown his work in a number of solo exhibitions throughout the United States, including venues Mass MoCA, The University of Texas Austin's Blanton Museum of Art, The University of Houston's Blaffer Art Museum, Artpace in San Antonio, The David Winton Bell Gallery at Brown University, Washington and Lee University's Staniar Gallery, The McNay Art Museum, San Antonio, The Mesa Contemporary Arts Center, The Snite Museum of Art at Notre Dame University, the University of Texas A&M, Laredo, the Richard E. Peeler Art Center at DePaul University, and the Dallas Contemporary.

Valdez has shown his work in a number of group exhibitions at venues including The Los Angeles County Museum of Art, The National Portrait Gallery, Washington, DC, Vincent Price Art Museum, Los Angeles, California, The Minnesota Museum of Art, St. Paul, Minnesota, The Phoenix Art Museum, Phoenix, Arizona, Crystal Bridges Museum of American Art, North Carolina Museum of Art, The Albuquerque Museum of Art, The National Museum of Mexican Art, Chicago, The Frye Art Museum, Seattle, and the Parsons School of Design, Paris, France.

Permanent collections
Valdez's work is included in the following permanent collections: Modern Art Museum of Fort Worth Permanent Collection, The Ford Foundation Permanent Collection, The Blanton Museum of Art Permanent Collection, The Museum of Fine Arts Houston Permanent Collection, The Bell Gallery/Brown University Permanent Collection, The Linda Pace Foundation Permanent Collection, ArtPace Permanent Collection, The Arkansas Drawing Center Permanent Collection, The McNay Museum of Art Permanent Collection, The National Museum of Mexican Art Permanent Collection, The Frye Museum of Art Permanent Collection, The Snite Museum of Art Permanent Collection, The University of Houston Public Art Collection, The Museum of Texas Tech University Public Art Collection, The San Antonio Museum of Art Permanent Collection, and The Cheech Marin Center for Chicano Art, Culture & Industry.

Artwork

Made Men, 2003

Made Men series was exhibited along with The Strangest Fruit series at Brown University's David Winton Bell Gallery (2013).

Stations, 2004

At 26, Valdez was the youngest artist to be awarded a solo exhibition at the McNay Art Museum in San Antonio, Texas. Stations emphasizes the physical toll of the sport and guides the viewer through one exhausting night in the life of a boxer. The series title connects it loosely to the theme of the Stations of the Cross, though Valdez's icons are secular rather than sacred.

Stations was exhibited at the McNay Art Museum in 2004 and The Mesa Contemporary Arts Center, Mesa, AZ in 2010.

El Chavez Ravine, 2009

El Chavez Ravine represents a collaborative effort between Valdez and the musician Ryland Peter "Ry" Cooder. Artist and musician worked together to restore a 1953 Chevy Good Humor ice cream truck and Valdez painted a little known historical narrative around the truck. The painting elucidates the story of Los Angeles's historically Mexican community, Chavez Ravine. Deemed the "worst slum in the city," the land was seized from Chavez Ravine homeowners using eminent domain and funds from the Housing Act of 1949. Though the neighborhood was demolished to make way for the Elysian Park Heights public housing project, the new high rise housing complex was never constructed. Instead the land was sold to Brooklyn Dodgers owner Walter O'Malley for the construction of Dodger Stadium. Valdez's painting illustrates the inhumane treatment of Chavez Ravine residents and also showcases their resistance against the seizure of their land.

Cooder's 2005 album, Chávez Ravine also recognizes the Chavez Ravine residents. In "3rd Base, Dodger Stadium," the fourteenth track on the album, Cooder's lyrics memorialize the community's historical link to the Chavez Ravine neighborhood: "I work here nights, parking cars, underneath the moon and stars / The same ones that we all knew back in 1952 / And if you want to know where a local boy like me is coming from: "3rd base, Dodger Stadium." Valdez's El Chavez Ravine painting wraps around the kind of ice cream truck that might have circulated in the Chavez Ravine neighborhood in 1953. Valdez discussed the piece: "This became an epic project for me, not only because of the time I invested into it, but because it is the only lowrider that I know of that is painted by hand with a brush and artist oil paints. Most importantly, I also felt like somewhat of an archeologist digging up a lost history that isn't in the textbooks."

El Chavez Ravine was exhibited at The San Antonio Museum of Art in 2009.

Excerpts for John, 2011–2012

Excerpts for John is a series of monochromatic paintings that illustrate a U.S. military funeral procession. The paintings are complemented with a film showing a casket draped in an American flag ethereally floating through San Antonio neighborhoods. As the title suggests, the series is dedicated to Valdez's friend, John. Valdez said, "This suite of paintings pays homage to my lifelong friend, 2nd Lt. John R. Holt Jr., (1978–2009) who survived a tour of duty in Iraq as a combat medic, but lost a battle with post-traumatic stress disorder in 2009. The varied backgrounds remain anonymous to the viewer, but depict the neighborhood that John and I grew up in."

Excerpts for John was exhibited at the McNay Art Museum in San Antonio, Texas in 2011. Selections from the series were exhibited at the Smithsonian National Portrait Gallery as part of the 2017 exhibition The Face of Battle: Americans at War 9/11-Present. A selection of Excerpts for John was also exhibited as part of the Los Angeles County Museum of Art Pacific Standard Time LA/LA 2017 exhibition Home—So Different, So Appealing.

The Strangest Fruit, 2013 
The Strangest Fruit series consists of nine paintings that feature Mexican and Mexican American men dressed in contemporary clothing and suspended from invisible nooses. The title of the series was inspired by Billie Holiday's famous 1939 song "Strange Fruit", which was adapted from Abel Meeropol's anti-lynching poem written in 1936. The Strangest Fruit series evokes a little known history of the lynching of Mexicans and Mexican Americans in the United States. Historians William Carrigan and Clive Webb have documented 547 cases of extralegal executions of people of Mexican origin or descent in states like Texas, California, and New Mexico, but suspect that the actual number of victims is considerably higher. In Valdez's series, each man is juxtaposed against a white background meant to symbolize forgotten histories and erased narratives of racialized violence against Mexicans and Mexican Americans. Juan Cartagena, the President and General Counsel of LatinoJustice PRLDEF notes that Valdez's The Strangest Fruit series "expertly juxtaposes the infamous symbol of state-sponsored/state ignored violence—here the visualized but invisible noose—with the bodies of young Latino men in modern attire." In his artist statement, Valdez enumerates these modern day threats as mass incarceration, the for-profit prison industry, the criminalization of poverty, biased justice systems, racial profiling, and mass deportation.

The Strangest Fruit series was exhibited at Brown University's David Winton Bell Gallery (2013), Artpace in San Antonio (2014), and Washington and Lee University's Staniar Gallery (2014). Selections from the series were exhibited as part of Crystal Bridges Museum of American Art's 2014 State of the Art exhibition.

The Beginning is Near, Part I: The City, 2015–2016 
The City I is a 30-foot-long black and white painting featuring fourteen hooded members of the Ku Klux Klan. The artwork was inspired by Philip Guston's City Limits (1969, Museum of Modern Art) and Gil Scott-Heron's song The Klan from his 1980 Real Eyes album. The City I is dedicated to Guston and Scott-Heron, bearing the inscription "To PG and GSH" in the lower right. An expansive and glowing city stretching out behind the figures provides the title for Valdez's painting. Near center, a hooded toddler wearing baby Nikes points out at the viewer, a direct reference to James Montgomery Flagg's famous World War I era Uncle Sam "I Want You for the U.S. Army" recruitment poster. On the convergence of Klan imagery and contemporary details such as beer cans, an iPhone, and a modern Chevrolet, Valdez said, "There's a shift happening. Two worlds are being pulled apart, or pulled together. You, as a viewer, are stuck in between. You have to decide who you are, where you are, and how you got there."

In March 2016, New York Times writer Lawrence Downes featured Valdez's The City I in an editorial piece. Dowes wrote, "Mr. Valdez was not planning to be prophetic when he began the painting last November. He is not a polemical artist, or a literal-minded one, though his paintings are striking for their attention to emotion, storytelling and the revealing detail. He could not have known how much the Ku Klux Klan, and white supremacy, would overtake the 2016 presidential campaign." The City received widespread coverage throughout Texas when it was first exhibited at the David Shelton Gallery in Houston, TX as part of the solo exhibition The Beginning is Near (Part I).

The paintings were acquired by The Blanton Museum of Art at the University of Texas, Austin and were on view beginning July 17, 2018. The Blanton Museum produced extensive programming to support the exhibition. The opening of the exhibition was covered in the New York Times, The Guardian, and Artnet News. On the evening of the opening, the Blanton Museum of Art hosted a conversation with Valdez and journalist Maria Hinojosa, anchor and executive producer of Latino USA on National Public Radio. In a February 2020 Artnet News piece identifying Valdez as one of four breakout artists from the Los Angeles Art Fairs, the author referenced the controversy surrounding The City I, which the author defines as a "sensationalistically misread painting." The Artnet News author goes on to note that, "Valdez has already been widely embraced by significant museums and art nonprofits, with more honors to come."

The Beginning is Near, Part II: Dream Baby Dream, 2018 

In 2019, Valdez exhibited Dream Baby Dream (2018) at MASS MoCA as part of the exhibition Suffering from Realness curated by Denise Markonish. Twelve mostly greyscale oil on paper paintings (42 x 72 inches) focus on the multi-ethnic cast of individuals who attended Muhammad Ali's funeral shortly after his death on June 3, 2016. Each person exhibits varying degrees of grief at the loss of the American icon. In the MASS MoCA exhibition catalogue, Markonish notes that each figure is “silent, hesitant, and even uncertain about their willingness to speak.” Markonish continues, “This potential muteness serves as an apt metaphor for our troubled times.” About the series, Valdez said, "This work reminds me on a daily basis that we are bound by similar patterns of history, experiences, and struggles for survival. Filtering the present through the past presents me with the difficult and private examination of my own tangled history--as a Mexican American in twenty-first-century America. I don't presume that painting can change the world. But, I stand firm in my belief that the artist can still provide critical moments of silence and clarity in times of immense distortion and chaos." Dream Baby Dream was first exhibited at the David Shelton Gallery in Houston in September 2017. At MASS MoCA, Dream Baby Dream was exhibited alongside Valdez's Requiem (2016–19), a collaborative piece created with Adriana Corral. Valdez and Corral organized a performance to mark the opening of Requiem. The artists processed Requiem, a monumental bronze representation of a dying golden eagle, alongside pall bearers, who carried the weight of the sculpture. A mariachi band accompanied the procession that was  inspired by a New Orleans  funeral; Valdez played the trumpet. Other artists who participated in Suffering from Realness include Aziz+Cucher, Cassils, Joey Fauerso, Jeffrey Gibson, Hayv Kahraman, Titus Kaphar, Roberto Longo, Christoper Mir, MPA, Wengechi Mutu, Allison Schulnik, Keith Sklar, and Robert Taplin.

Documentaries about Valdez's work
2020: American Masters, In the Making: The Beginning is Near, Filmmaker Ray Santisteban, PBS
2013: Vincent Valdez: Excerpts for John, Walley Films
2009: A behind the scenes look at the making of at Vincent Valdez "El Chávez Ravine"
2009: Vincent Valdez: The Art of Boxing by Ray Santisteban
2009: Vincent Valdez: El Chávez Ravine – Research & Painting

Oral Histories with Valdez

 2005: University of Notre Dame ILS Oral History Project
 2020: Archives of American Art Pandemic Oral History Project

References

External links
Vincent Valdez

Living people
1977 births
American male artists
20th-century American painters
People from San Antonio
Rhode Island School of Design alumni
21st-century American painters
Painters from Texas
20th-century American male artists
Skowhegan School of Painting and Sculpture alumni